Karlštejn is a market town in Beroun District in the Central Bohemian Region of the Czech Republic. It has about 800 inhabitants. It is known for the Karlštejn Castle.

Geography
It lies in the Hořovice Uplands. The built-up area in situated in a valley of the river Berounka and its tributary, the Budňanský Stream. The entire municipal territory lies within the Bohemian Karst Protected Landscape Area.

History
The predecessor of Karlštejn was Budňany, a settlement founded in 1348 by craftsmen who built the Karlštejn Castle. In 1952, the modern market town of Karlštejn was created by merging Budňany and Poučník municipalities and named after the castle.

Sights
The large gothic castle Karlštejn is one of the most famous and most frequently visited castles in the Czech Republic.

Notable people
Kateřina of Komárov (15??–1534), serial killer; lived and murdered here

Twin towns – sister cities

Karlštejn is twinned with:
 Althen-des-Paluds, France
 Montecarlo, Italy
 Reichenbach im Vogtland, Germany

References

External links

Market towns in the Czech Republic
Populated places in the Beroun District